The 2002–03 Nemzeti Bajnokság I, also known as NB I, was the 101st season of top-tier football in Hungary. The league was officially named Borsodi Liga for sponsoring reasons. The season started on 26 July 2002 and ended on 31 May 2003.

Overview
It was contested by 12 teams, and MTK Hungária FC won the championship.

First stage

League standings

Results

Second stage

Championship playoff

League standings

Results

Relegation playoff

League standings

Results

Statistical leaders

Top goalscorers

References
Hungary - List of final tables (RSSSF)

Nemzeti Bajnokság I seasons
1
Hungary